State Route 68, also known as SR 68, is an east–west highway in northwestern Arizona running from its western terminus at its junction with State Route 95 in Bullhead City to a grade-separated interchange at U.S. Route 93 northwest of Kingman. The western terminus formerly extended just to the west of its current point to Davis Dam; this became Mohave County Road 68 in 1998.

Route description

The primary purpose of this route is to carry traffic to Bullhead City and Laughlin, Nevada.  Since September 11, 2001, the highway had also composed part of the mandatory detour for trucks and recreational vehicles traveling between Arizona and Las Vegas, Nevada via US 93, due to the heavy vehicle restrictions over Hoover Dam.  The detour was temporary and was removed in 2010, when the new bypass was completed south of the dam .

History
SR 68 was a 2 lane highway and had a high grade going through the Black Mountains. The highway was expanded to 4 lanes in the mid-1990s and now has a smoother ride through the mountains. There are two runaway truck ramps at 6 and 10 miles westwards downhill from Union Pass.

Beginning with 2015 model year vehicles, SAE standard J2807 standardizes the setting of maximum trailer towing capacities.

Junction list

References

External links

SR 68 - Arizona Roads

068
Transportation in Mohave County, Arizona